Doris Tomasini (born 13 February 1984, in Rovereto) is an Italian female sprinter.

Biography
At senior level she two medals, with the national relay team, at the International athletics competitions.

Achievements

See also
 Italy national relay team

References

External links
 

1984 births
Italian female sprinters
People from Rovereto
Living people
Mediterranean Games bronze medalists for Italy
Athletes (track and field) at the 2005 Mediterranean Games
Universiade medalists in athletics (track and field)
Mediterranean Games medalists in athletics
Universiade gold medalists for Italy
Medalists at the 2009 Summer Universiade
Sportspeople from Trentino